L'isola non trovata is an album of Italian singer-songwriter Francesco Guccini. It was released in December 1970 by EMI, under the nickname "Francesco".

Personnel
Francesco Guccini - voice and guitar
Ares Tavolazzi - bass
Ellade Bandini - drums
Vince Tempera - piano, keyboards
Deborah Kooperman - folk guitar
Franco Mussida - guitars
Victor Sogliani - voice

Track listing 

"L'isola non trovata" (2:43)
"L'orizzonte di K.D." (3:00)
"La collina" (3:40)
"Il frate" (5:00)
"Un altro giorno è andato"  (4:11)
"Canzone di notte" (5:04)
"Il tema" (4:19)
"L'uomo" (5:23)
"Asia" (5:12)
"L'isola non trovata" (0:54)

External links
Album review 

Isola non trovata
Isola non trovata
Italian-language albums
EMI Records albums